"You’re Not My Kind of Girl" is a 1988 song by R&B/Pop group New Edition, and the second single from their fifth studio album, Heart Break.

Overview
Written and produced by Jimmy Jam & Terry Lewis with Ralph Tresvant, Johnny Gill and Ricky Bell on lead vocals, this mid-tempo song is about a man being fancied by a woman who he thinks is not his type, and is trying to gently let her down.  His friends, meanwhile, can’t understand his lack of interest in said female, who they believe is a catch.

Release and reaction
Though the song was a sizable hit on urban radio, peaking at #3 on the R&B charts in the fall of 1988— unlike its predecessor, “If It Isn’t Love,” it failed to make the same impression on Billboard’s Hot 100 singles chart—where it peaked at #95.

Music video
The music video for “You’re Not My Kind of Girl” is set to a concert performance of the song (which was led in by the music video for “If It Isn’t Love.”) The concert was held at Sony Pictures Studios in Culver City, California. New Edition held a radio contest for tickets to the taping, which were won by LA resident, Viveca McGuire. The version of the song featured in the music video is the single version of the Extended Version, rather than the one from the studio album.

References

1988 singles
New Edition songs
Songs written by Jimmy Jam and Terry Lewis
Song recordings produced by Jimmy Jam and Terry Lewis
1988 songs
MCA Records singles